Edward R. and Sallie Ann Coward House is a historic home located near Ormondsville, Greene County, North Carolina.  It was built about 1850, and is a two-story, single pile, three bay, Greek Revival style heavy timber frame dwelling.  It has a one-story rear ell and low hip roof.

It was listed on the National Register of Historic Places in 2002.

References

Houses on the National Register of Historic Places in North Carolina
Greek Revival houses in North Carolina
Houses completed in 1850
Houses in Greene County, North Carolina
National Register of Historic Places in Greene County, North Carolina